Rosie Dixon – Night Nurse is a 1978 British comedy film directed by Justin Cartwright and starring Debbie Ash, Carolyne Argyle, Beryl Reid and John Le Mesurier. It is based on a novel by Christopher Wood.  The plot revolves around a new student nurse at a hospital, who attracts interest from the staff with comic consequences.

The film is one of several softcore sex comedies released in the 1970s to cash in on the success of the Confessions series (also written by Wood under the pseudonym 'Timothy Lea'). Like the Confessions films, it was adapted from a book, the author's credit going to the fictional Rosie herself. It is the only one of the nine Rosie Dixon novels to be adapted into a movie. The character of Penny Sutton – Rosie's best friend in the movie and in the books –  is the star of an earlier series of similar novels that depict Penny as an airline stewardess.

Star Debbie Ash is better known as one of the dance troupe Hot Gossip, along with her sister Leslie Ash (later a TV star in her own right), who plays Rosie's sister Natalie.

Cast

References

External links

1978 films
1970s sex comedy films
British sex comedy films
Films shot at EMI-Elstree Studios
1970s English-language films
Films with screenplays by Christopher Wood (writer)
1978 comedy films
1970s British films